Albert Wadel Moursund III (May 25, 1919 – April 22, 2002) was an American lawyer and politician.

Biography
Moursund was born in Johnson City, Texas and graduated from Austin High School in Austin, Texas in 1936. In 1941, Moursund received his law degree from the University of Texas Law School and was admitted to the Texas bar. He practiced law in Johnson City, Texas. During World War II, Moursund served in the United States Army Air Forces and was commissioned a staff sergeant. Moursund served in the Texas House of Representatives from 1949 to 1953 and was a Democrat. He then served as county judge for Blanco County, Texas from 1953 to 1959. He was involved with the electric cooperative, insurance, abstract, and banking businesses. Moursund also owned several ranches. He was a friend and adviser to President Lyndon Johnson and his wife Lady Bird Johnson. Moursund died at his home in Round Mountain, Texas.

Notes

External links

1919 births
2002 deaths
People from Blanco County, Texas
Military personnel from Texas
United States Army Air Forces soldiers
University of Texas School of Law alumni
Texas lawyers
Businesspeople from Texas
Ranchers from Texas
County judges in Texas
Democratic Party members of the Texas House of Representatives
United States Army Air Forces personnel of World War II